The 1988 Spanish general strike, known locally as 14-D (shortened form of 14 Diciembre), was a general strike in Spain that took place on December 14, 1988. It was called by the two main trade unions: CCOO and Unión General de Trabajadores (UGT).

Triggered by a significant reform in the labour market, namely a new more flexible contract for inexperienced youngsters with less redundancy pay, the strike was moreover a manifestation of general discontent with Spain's PSOE government policies. The government's economic policies were thought to be too conservative by trade unions and many left-wing voters.

The country was completely and peacefully paralyzed for 24 hours, prompting the government to negotiate with the unions. Even the TV signal was turned off by the workers. That flexible contract was retired and welfare state was increased. However, the strike did not prevent a third absolute majority by PSOE, whose leader, Felipe González, remained popular.

Consequences of the 14-D strike
Some economists believe the strike was the cause of a large increase in public spending, which led to an increase in the budget deficit. Others prefer to attribute public spending to the 1992 Olympic Games held in Barcelona, the 1992 world fair in Seville, plus the first high-speed train, for the large budget deficit. The budget deficit led to spending cuts which, coupled with a tough monetary policy, led to a recession in 1993.

Use of 14-D in other strikes
Some minority unions, including the students' union, the anarchist union, CNT, and the second largest teachers' union, STEC, called a strike in the educational sector for 14-D, 2005 to use the symbolic power of 14-D as a strike called by the left against the PSOE government and to protest a new education law which they thought gave too much money to private schools, which are mostly Catholic, in Spain. The strike had limited success due to lack of support from other unions.

Other important general strikes in modern Spain 
1985 strike (24 hours): only called by CC.OO., one of the two main unions, against reforms in the pension system.
1991 strike (4 hours): against Gulf War.
1992 strike (8 hours): against labour market reforms.
1994 strike (24 hours): against labour market reforms.
2002 strike (24 hours): against labour market reforms.
2003 strike (2 hours): against Iraq War (only called by UGT).
2010 strike
2012 strike on 29 March

See also 
Workers' Commissions
Unión General de Trabajadores
Confederación Nacional del Trabajo
La Canadenca strike
Marcelino Camacho
Felipe González

References

External links 
 Tve broadcast about the 30th anniversary of the General Strike of 14 D 1988; 14 December 2018
 Video of Spanish TV broadcast of 13 December 1988, with transmission cut and test pattern at 12:00 a.m.
 Video commemorating the 30th anniversary of the General Strike

Spanish General Strike, 1988
General strikes in Spain
Labour disputes in Spain
Labour movement in Spain
Spanish General Strike, 1988
Spanish General Strike, 1988
Protests in Spain